Dyschirius affinis is a species of ground beetle in the subfamily Scaritinae. It was described by Fall in 1901.

References

affinis
Beetles described in 1901